Asterope markii, the dotted glory, is a species of butterfly of the family Nymphalidae. It is found in Brazil, Ecuador, Colombia, Peru, Guyana, and Venezuela.

The larvae feed on Paullinia species.

Subspecies
Asterope markii markii (Hewitson, 1857)  (Brazil (Amazonas))
Asterope markii boyi (Röber, 1924)  (Brazil (Pará))
Asterope markii ackeryi Jenkins, 1987 (Brazil (Pará))
Asterope markii hewitsoni (Staudinger, 1886)  (Ecuador, Colombia)
Asterope markii davisii (Butler, 1877)  (Peru, Ecuador, Brazil (Acre))
Asterope markii gallardi Neukirchen, 1996 (French Guiana)
Asterope markii werneri Neukirchen, 1996 (Brazil (Amazonas))

External links
Butterflies of the Amazon rainforest
Linnean 18-1 – January 2002

Fauna of Brazil
Biblidinae
Nymphalidae of South America
Butterflies described in 1857
Taxa named by William Chapman Hewitson